The Portuguese man o' war (Physalia physalis), also known as the man-of-war, is a marine hydrozoan found in the Atlantic Ocean and the Indian Ocean. It is considered to be the same species as the Pacific man o' war or blue bottle, which is found mainly in the Pacific Ocean. The Portuguese man o' war is the only species in the genus Physalia, which in turn is the only genus in the family Physaliidae. 

The Portuguese man o' war is a conspicuous member of the neuston, the community of organisms that live at the ocean surface. It has numerous venomous microscopic nematocysts which deliver a painful sting powerful enough to kill fish, and has been known to occasionally kill humans. Although it superficially resembles a jellyfish, the Portuguese man o' war is in fact a siphonophore. Like all siphonophores, it is a colonial organism, made up of many smaller units called zooids. All zooids in a colony are genetically identical, but fulfill specialized functions such as feeding and reproduction, and together allow the colony to operate as a single individual.

Taxonomy
The blue bottle, Pacific man o' war or Indo-Pacific Portuguese man o' war, distinguished by a smaller float and a single long fishing tentacle, was originally considered a separate species in the same genus (P. utriculus). The name was synonymized with P. physalis in 2007, and it is now considered a regional form of the same species.

Etymology
The name man o' war comes from the man-of-war, a sailing warship, and the animal's resemblance to the Portuguese version (the caravel) at full sail.

Overview
The siphonophore Physalia physalis, commonly known as the Portuguese man o' war, is one of the most conspicuous, but poorly understood, members of the neuston. The neuston is the floating community of ocean organisms that live at the interface between water and air. This community is exposed to a unique set of environmental conditions including prolonged exposure to intense ultraviolet light, desiccation risk, and rough sea and wave conditions. Despite their tolerance for extreme environmental conditions and the very large size of this habitat, which makes up 71% of the Earth's surface and is nearly three times the area of all terrestrial habitats, very little is known about the organisms that make up this highly specialized polyphyletic community. 

The Portuguese man o' war is aptly named after a warship: it uses part of an enlarged float filled with carbon monoxide and air as a sail to travel by wind for thousands of miles, dragging behind long tentacles that deliver a deadly venomous sting to fish. This sailing ability, combined with a painful sting and a life cycle with seasonal blooms, results in periodic mass beach strandings and occasional human envenomations, making P. physalis the most infamous siphonophore.

The development, morphology, and colony organization of P. physalis is very different from all other siphonophores. Siphonophores are a relatively understudied group of colonial hydrozoans. Colonies are composed of functionally specialized bodies (termed zooids) that are homologous to free living individuals. Most species are planktonic and are found at most depths from the deep sea to the surface of the ocean. They are fragile and difficult to collect intact, and must be collected by submersible, remotely operated vehicle, by hand while blue-water diving, or in regions with localized upwellings. However, Physalia physalis is the most accessible, conspicuous, and robust siphonophore, and as such, much has been written about this species, including the chemical composition of its float, venom (especially envenomations), occurrence, and distribution. Fewer studies, however, have taken a detailed look at P. physalis structure, including development, histology of major zooids, and broader descriptions of colony arrangement. These studies provide an important foundation for understanding the morphology, cellular anatomy, and development of this neustonis species. It can be difficult to understand the morphology, growth, and development of P. physalis within the context of siphonophore diversity, as the colony consists of highly 3-dimensional branching structures and develops very different from all other siphonophores.

The bluebottle resembles a jellyfish but is actually a siphonophore, a colonial organism composed of small individual animals called zooids. There are four zooids depending on each other for survival and performing different functions, such as digestion (gastrozooids), reproduction (gonozooids) and hunting (dactylozooids). The last zooid, the pneumatophore, is a gas-filled float or sac that supports the other zooids and acts like a sail so the bluebottle is constrained to the ocean surface, moving at the mercy of the wind, waves and marine currents. The bluebottle's long tentacles hang below the float as they drift, fishing for prey to sting and drag up to their digestive zooids.

The species is found throughout the world's oceans, in tropical, subtropical and (occasionally) temperate regions.

Anatomy and physiology

Like all siphonophores, the Portuguese man o' war is colonial: each man o' war is composed of many smaller units (zooids) that hang in clusters from under a large, gas-filled structure called the pneumatophore. New zooids are added by budding as the colony grows. As many as seven different kinds of zooids have been described in the man o' war: three of the medusoid type (gonophores, nectophores, and vestigial nectophores) and four of the polypoid type (free gastrozooids, tentacle-bearing zooids, gonozooids and gonopalpons). However, naming and categorization of zooids varies between authors, and much of the embryonic and evolutionary relationships of zooids remains unclear.

The pneumatophore, or bladder, is the most conspicuous part of the man o' war. The pneumatophore functions as both a flotation device and a sail for the colony, allowing the colony to move with the prevailing wind. The gas in the pneumatophore is part carbon monoxide (0.5–13%), which is actively produced by the animal, and part atmospheric gases (nitrogen, oxygen and noble gases) that diffuse in from the surrounding air. In the event of a surface attack, the pneumatophore can be deflated, allowing the colony to temporarily submerge.

The colony hunts and feeds through the cooperation of two types of zooid: gastrozooids and tentacle-bearing zooids known as dactylozooids or tentacular palpons. Each tentacle bears tiny, coiled, thread-like structures called nematocysts. Nematocysts trigger and inject venom on contact, stinging, paralyzing, and killing adult or larval squids and fishes. Large groups of Portuguese man o' war, sometimes over 1,000 individuals, may deplete fisheries. Contraction of tentacles drags the prey upward, into range of the gastrozooids, the digestive zooids. The gastrozooids surround and digest the food by secreting enzymes. P. physalis typically has multiple stinging tentacles, but a regional form (previously known as a separate species, P. utriculus) has only a single stinging tentacle.

The main reproductive zooids, the gonophores, are situated on branching structures called gonodendra. Gonophores produce sperm or eggs (see life cycle). Besides gonophores, each gonodendron also contains several other types of specialized zooids: gonozooids (which are accessory gastrozooids), nectophores (which have been speculated to allow detached gonodendra to swim), and vestigial nectophores (also called jelly polyps; the function of these is unclear).

Coloniality
The man o' war is described as a colonial organism because the individual zooids in a colony are evolutionarily derived from either polyps or medusae, i.e. the two basic body plans of cnidarians. Both of these body plans comprise entire individuals in non-colonial cnidarians (for example, a jellyfish is a medusa; a sea anemone is a polyp). All zooids in a man o' war develop from the same single fertilized egg and are therefore genetically identical; they remain physiologically connected throughout life, and essentially function as organs in a shared body. Hence, a Portuguese man o' war constitutes a single individual from an ecological perspective, but is made up of many individuals from an embryological perspective.

Distribution

Found mostly in tropical and subtropical waters, the Portuguese man-o-war lives at the surface of the ocean. The gas-filled bladder, or pneumatophore, remains at the surface, while the remainder is submerged. Portuguese man-o-war have no means of propulsion, and move passively, driven by the winds, currents, and tides.

Winds can drive them into bays or onto beaches. Often, finding a single Portuguese man o' war is followed by finding many others in the vicinity. The Portuguese man o' war is well known to beachgoers for the painful stings delivered by its tentacles. Because they can sting while beached, the discovery of a man o' war washed up on a beach may lead to the closure of the beach.

Drifting dynamics

Despite being a common occurrence, the origin of the man o' war or bluebottle before reaching the coastline is not well understood, and neither is the way it drifts at the surface of the ocean.

Left- and right-handedness
For each man o' war or bluebottle, the float can be oriented towards the left or the right (dimorphism), believed to be an adaptation that prevents the entire population from being washed on shore to die. The "left-handed" bluebottles sail to the right of the wind, while the "right-handed" bluebottles sail to the left. The wind will always push the two types of bluebottles in different directions, so at most half the population will be pushed towards the coast. Regional populations of Portuguese man o' war can have substantial differences in float size and the number of long tentacles used for hunting. The regional form previously known as P. utriculus, the bluebottle, has a float rarely exceeding 10 cm in length and has one long hunting tentacle that is less than 3 m long. In comparison, the typical man o' war has a float of around 15 cm, reported up to 30 cm, and several hunting tentacles that can reach 30 m in mature colonies when fully extended.

A Portuguese man o' war is somewhat asymmetrically shaped: the zooids of the colony hang down not quite from the midline of the pneumatophore, but offset to either the right or left side of the midline. When combined with the trailing action of the tentacles (which function as a sea anchor), this left- or right-handedness makes the colony sail sideways relative to the wind, by about 45° in either direction. Colony handedness has therefore been theorized to affect man o' war migration, with left-handed or right-handed colonies potentially being more likely to drift down particular respective sea routes. While previously believed to develop as a result of what winds a colony experienced, handedness in fact emerges early in the colony's life, while it is still living below the surface of the sea.

Mathematical modelling
Since they cannot swim, the movement of the man o' war or bluebottle can be modelled mathematically by calculating the forces acting on it, or by advecting virtual particles in ocean and atmospheric circulation models. Earlier studies modelled the movement of the man o' war with Lagrangian particle tracking to explain major beaching events. In 2017, Ferrer and Pastor were able to estimate the region of origin of a significant beaching event on the Basque coast. They ran a Lagrangian model backwards in time, using wind velocity and a wind drag coefficient as drivers of the man o' war motion. They found that the region of origin was the North Atlantic subtropical gyre. In 2015 Prieto et al. included both the effect of the surface currents and wind to predict the initial colony position prior to major beaching events in the Mediterranean. This model assumed the man o' war was advected by the surface currents, with the effect of the wind being added with a much higher wind drag coefficient of 10 percent. Similarly, in 2020 Headlam et al. used beaching and offshore observations to identify a region of origin, using the joint effects of surface currents and wind drag, for the largest mass man o' war beaching on the Irish coastline in over 150 years.  These earlier studies used numerical models in combination with simple assumptions to calculate the drift of this species, excluding complex drifting dynamics. In 2021, Lee et al. provide a parameterisation for Lagrangian modelling of the bluebottle by considering the similarities between the bluebottle and a sailboat. This allowed them to compute the hydrodynamic and aerodynamic forces acting on the bluebottle and use an equilibrium condition to create a generalised model for calculating the drifting speed and course of the bluebottle under any wind and ocean current conditions.

Ecology

Predators and prey

The Portuguese man o' war is a carnivore. Using its venomous tentacles, a man o' war traps and paralyzes its prey while "reeling" it inwards to the digestive polyps. It typically feeds on small adult fish and fish fry (young fish), and sometimes zooplankton, shrimp and other small crustaceans.

The organism has few predators of its own; one example is the loggerhead turtle, which feeds on the Portuguese man o' war as a common part of its diet. The turtle's skin, including that of its tongue and throat, is too thick for the stings to penetrate. Also, the blue sea slug Glaucus atlanticus specializes in feeding on the Portuguese man o' war, as does the violet snail Janthina janthina. The ocean sunfish's diet, once thought to consist mainly of jellyfish, has been found to include many species, the Portuguese man o' war being one such example.

The blanket octopus is immune to the venom of the Portuguese man o' war; young individuals have been observed to carry broken man o' war tentacles, which males and immature females rip off and use for offensive and defensive purposes.

The man-of-war fish, Nomeus gronovii, is a driftfish native to the Atlantic, Pacific and Indian Oceans.  It is notable for its ability to live within the deadly tentacles of the Portuguese man o' war, upon whose tentacles and gonads it feeds. Rather than using mucus to prevent nematocysts from firing, as is seen in some of the clownfish sheltering among sea anemones, the fish appears to use highly agile swimming to physically avoid tentacles. The fish has a very high number of vertebrae (41), which may add to its agility and primarily uses its pectoral fins for swimming—a feature of fish that specialize in maneuvering tight spaces. It also has a complex skin design and at least one antigen to the man o' war's toxin. Although the fish seems to be 10 times more resistant to the toxin than other fish, it can be stung by the dactylozooides (large tentacles), which it actively avoids. The smaller gonozooids do not seem to sting the fish and the fish is reported to frequently "nibble" on these tentacles.

Commensalism and symbiosis
The Portuguese man o' war is often found with a variety of other marine fish, including yellow jack. These fish benefit from the shelter from predators provided by the stinging tentacles, and for the Portuguese , the presence of these species may attract other fish to eat.

Life cycle

Man o' war individuals are dioecious, meaning each colony is either male or female. Gonophores producing either sperm or eggs (depending on the sex of the colony) sit on a tree-like structure called a gonodendron, which is believed to drop off from the colony during reproduction. Mating takes place primarily in the autumn, when eggs and sperm are shed from gonophores into the water. As neither fertilization nor early development have been directly observed in the wild, it is not yet known at what depth they occur.

A fertilized man o' war egg develops into a larva that buds off new zooids as it grows, gradually forming a new colony. This development initially occurs under the water, and has been reconstructed by comparing different stages of larvae collected at sea. The first two structures to emerge are the pneumatophore (sail) and a single, early feeding zooid called a protozooid; later, gastrozooids and tentacle-bearing zooids are added. Eventually, the growing pneumatophore becomes buoyant enough to carry the immature colony on the surface of the water.

Venom

The stinging, venom-filled nematocysts in the tentacles of the Portuguese man o' war can paralyze small fish and other prey. Detached tentacles and dead specimens (including those that wash up on shore) can sting just as painfully as those of the live organism in the water and may remain potent for hours or even days after the death of the organism or the detachment of the tentacle.

Stings usually cause severe pain to humans, leaving whip-like red welts on the skin that normally last two or three days after the initial sting. The pain normally subsides after about one to three hours (depending on the victim's biology). However, the venom can travel to the lymph nodes and may cause symptoms that mimic an allergic reaction, including swelling of the larynx, airway blockage, cardiac distress and an inability to breathe. Other symptoms may include fever and shock and, in some extreme cases, even death, although this is extremely rare. Medical attention for those exposed to large numbers of tentacles may become necessary to relieve pain or open airways if the pain becomes excruciating or lasts for more than three hours, or if breathing becomes difficult. Instances in which the stings completely surround the trunk of a young child are among those that may be fatal.

The species is responsible for up to 10,000 human stings in Australia each summer, particularly on the east coast, with some others occurring off the coast of South Australia and Western Australia.

Treatment of stings
Stings from a Portuguese man o' war can result in severe dermatitis characterized by long, thin, open wounds that resemble those caused by a whip. These are not caused by any impact or cutting action, but by irritating urticariogenic substances in the tentacles.

In 2017, vinegar (acetic acid, 5% acidity) rinsing (irreversibly inhibiting cnidae discharge), then applying heat, water or hot pack, at 45 °C (113 °F), for 45 minutes, was found to be the most effective treatment, while rinsing with seawater, cold packs, urine, baking soda, shaving cream, soap, lemon juice, alcohol, rubbing alcohol, and cola will trigger the release of more venom.

In 2009, isolated studies had suggested that in some individuals vinegar dousing may increase toxin delivery and worsen symptoms. In 1988, vinegar was claimed to provoke hemorrhaging when used on the less severe stings of cnidocytes of smaller species.

Gallery

See also
Chondrophores (porpitids), a different hydrozoan colonial organism
Velella, a smaller hydrozoa which has a similar shape and colouration.
Porpita porpita
Siphonophorae

References

Further reading

External links

Siphonophores.org General information
Portuguese Man-of-War National Geographic
Blue bottle Life In The Fast Lane
PortugueseManOfWar.com
Physalia physalis discussed on RNZ Critter of the Week, 24 December 2021.

 
Cystonectae
Cnidarians of the Atlantic Ocean
Cnidarians of the Indian Ocean
Cnidarians of the Pacific Ocean
Cnidarians of the Caribbean Sea
Animals described in 1758
Taxa named by Carl Linnaeus
Venomous animals